Panty & Stocking with Garterbelt is a Japanese anime television series produced by Gainax. The series follows two angel sisters, Panty and Stocking, who were kicked out of Heaven for bad behavior and, in order to return, must earn Heaven Coins by defeating Ghosts, evil spirits that plague Daten City. The series was first broadcast in Japan on October 1, 2010 on BS-NTV. Internationally, the series was streamed online on Crunchyroll. A collection of animated shorts was included exclusively on the fifth Blu-ray Disc/DVD volume released on April 28, 2011. The show's music and themes are composed by Taku Takahashi of m-flo. The opening theme, "Theme for Panty and Stocking", is performed by Hoshina Anniversary while the ending theme, "Fallen Angel", is sung by Aimee B. Each episode's title is a reference to film titles, both Japanese and international. The series has been licensed in North America by Funimation, which was renamed to Crunchyroll by its current parent Sony.

Episode list

References

Lists of anime episodes